The 2023 Uruguayan Segunda División will be the season of second division professional of football in Uruguay. A total of 14 teams competed; the top two teams and the winner of the Championship play-offs will be promoted to the Uruguayan Primera División.

Club information

Torneo Competencia

Serie A

Serie B

Final

Fase Regular

Promotion Playoffs

Semi-finals

First Leg

Second Leg

Finals

Relegation

See also
2023 Uruguayan Primera División season
2023 Copa Uruguay

References

Uruguayan Segunda División seasons
2